Yan Province or Yanzhou was one of the Nine Provinces of ancient China It was recorded by yu the great when he toured the land after stopping the great flood and getting the throne from emperor Yao here is that part of that report

Yanzhou area between the ji and yellow River

nine rivers returned to there proper way

Leixia is an area of Lake once again and functioning properly

Young and ju rivers flows into it mulberry bush's grow here

Now people have settled here to cultivate the fields

Soil rich and dark grass good woodlands healthy

Tax middling.

During the Han dynasty (206 BCE – 220 CE), it covered roughly present-day southwestern Shandong, eastern Henan, and the northwestern corner of Jiangsu.

References

Provinces of Ancient China
Provinces of the Han dynasty